Ulf Andersson (born 27 June 1951) is a leading Swedish chess player. FIDE awarded him the International Master title in 1970 and the Grandmaster title in 1972.

Career
At his peak, Andersson reached number four on the FIDE rating list. Tournaments he has won or shared first include the 1969 Swedish Chess Championship, Göteborg 1971, Dortmund 1973, Camagüez 1974, Cienfuegos 1975, Belgrade 1977, Buenos Aires 1978, Hastings 1978–79, Phillips & Drew 1980, Johannesburg 1981, Phillips & Drew 1982, Turin 1982, Wijk aan Zee 1983, Reggio Emilia 1985, Rome 1985, and Rome 1986. He drew a six-game match against former world champion Mikhail Tal in 1983, and played top board in the second USSR versus The Rest of The World Match in 1984. He led the Swedish Chess Olympiad Team during the 1970s and 1980s, and reached his best personal result in the 23rd Chess Olympiad in Buenos Aires 1978, where he finished in third place after Viktor Korchnoi and Orestes Rodríguez Vargas.

Playing style
Andersson is a very solid . He draws a high percentage of his games against fellow grandmasters . He is renowned as a great player of endgames, especially rook endgames, and is famous for winning seemingly "unwinnable" endgames, often in very long games . Jacob Aagaard wrote about Andersson in his book Excelling at Chess stating "He is a very prophylactic player, seeing all kinds of tactics well in advance and avoiding pitfalls with great skill." Chess writer Dennis Monokroussos once remarked of Andersson's style,
For most of us, if we're playing a peer and major exchanges occur, a quick draw is the likely result ... for Andersson ... exchanges [are] often not the prelude to a quick draw but the signal that it [is] time for his opponent to start suffering.

Correspondence play
In recent years, Andersson has begun playing correspondence chess, quickly becoming a grandmaster in that form of chess as well. In 2002, he reached the top of the correspondence chess rating list . His correspondence games tend to be very tactical, which contrasts sharply with his style of play . Very few players in history have been as successful as Andersson at both forms of chess.

Notable games

In the following game, using the "hedgehog" formation he in part originated (characterized by a half-open c- and pawns on a6, b6, d6, and e6, knights on d7 and f6, bishops on b7 and e7, a rook on c8, and  castling), Andersson inflicts upon Anatoly Karpov the latter's first loss as world champion: 

Karpov vs. Andersson, Milan 1975 1.e4 c5 2.Nf3 e6 3.d4 cxd4 4.Nxd4 Nc6 5.Nb5 d6 6.c4 Nf6 7.N1c3 a6 8.Na3 Be7 9.Be2 0-0 10.0-0 b6 11.Be3 Bb7 12.Rc1 Re8 13.Qb3 Nd7 14.Rfd1 Rc8 15.Rd2 Qc7 16.Qd1 Qb8 17.f3 Ba8 18.Qf1 Nce5 19.Nab1 Nf6 20.Kh1 h6 21.Rdd1 Bf8 22.Nd2 Rcd8 23.Qf2 Ned7 24.a3 (diagram) d5 25.cxd5 exd5 26.exd5 Bd6 27.Nf1 Rxe3 (an exchange sacrifice) 28.Nxe3 Bxh2 29.Nf1 Bf4 30.Rc2 b5 31.Bd3 Nb6 32.Be4 Nc4 33.a4 Re8 34.axb5 axb5 35.Re2 Be5 36.Qc5 Nd6 37.Na2 Ndxe4 38.fxe4 Bd6 39.Qc2 Re5 40.g3 Qe8 41.Rde1 Bb7 42.Kg1 Nh7 43.Nc1 Ng5 44.Nd2 Bb4 45.Kf2 Bxd2 46.Rxd2 Nxe4+ 47.Rxe4 Rxe4 48.Ne2 Bc8 49.Nc3 Re1 50.Ne2 Ra1 51.Rd4 Qd8 52.Qc6 Bd7 53.Qd6 Qe8 54.Qf4 Qc8 55.b4 Bh3 56.Qe4 Bf5 57.Qe3 Qc2 58.g4 Bd7 59.Qe4 Qb3 60.Qd3 Qb2 61.Qe4 Ra8 62.Qe3 Ra2 63.d6 Ra8 64.Re4 Bc6 65.Qd4 Qb1 66.Re7 Qh1 67.Qf4 Qg2+ 68.Ke1 Ra1+ 69.Kd2 Qd5+ 70.Qd4 Ra2+ 71.Kc3 Qf3+ 72.Re3 Ra3+ 73.Kd2 Ra2+ 74.Ke1 Qh1+ 75.Kf2 Qg2+ 76.Ke1 Qh1+ 77.Kf2 Ra1 78.Rc3 Qg2+ 79.Ke3 Qf3+

References

Bibliography

External links

 
 
 
 
 

1951 births
Living people
Chess grandmasters
Correspondence chess grandmasters
Chess double grandmasters
Chess Olympiad competitors
Swedish chess players
Sportspeople from Västerås